Joliet Junior College (JJC) is a public community college in Joliet, Illinois.  Founded in 1901, it was the first public community college founded in the United States.

In Spring 2014, the college enrolled 16,375 students.  Every year, 48,000 students enroll in the college's academic programs and in non-credit programs.

History
Joliet Junior College was founded in 1901 by J. Stanley Brown, Superintendent of Joliet Township High School, and William Rainey Harper, President of the University of Chicago. Brown, who came to Joliet in 1893, first served as the principal of the high school. Throughout his time in Joliet, Brown became a well-known supporter of higher education, and would often encourage his students to attend college after graduation. Many students did not attend college because it was too expensive.  Brown consulted his friend, Harper, and together they created Joliet Junior College. Classes took place at Joliet Township High School. The first class was made up of six students in 1901.

In 1916, the name of the institution was formalized. In 1917, Joliet Junior College received accreditation from the North Central Association of Colleges and Schools. Joliet Junior College's student newspaper, The Blazer, was first published in October 1929. Before The Blazer, college bulletins were reported in the high school paper.

Joliet Junior College moved to its current location, at 1215 Houbolt Road in Joliet, in September 1969. The building at this location became fully operational in 1974. Joliet Junior College's first president, Elmer Rowley, was instrumental in establishing this new building and location.

Today, Joliet Junior College has additional sites in Romeoville, Morris, and Frankfort, all in Illinois.

Campus locations
The college has three campuses and three centers:
 Main Campus, 1215 Houbolt, Joliet, IL 60431
 City Center Campus, 235 North Chicago Street, Joliet, IL 60432
 Romeoville Campus, 1125 W. Romeo Road, Romeoville, IL 60446
 Morris Education Center, 725 School Street, Morris, IL 60450
 Frankfort Education Center, 201 Colorado Avenue, Frankfort, IL 60423
 Weitendorf Agricultural Education Center, 17840 W. Laraway Road, Joliet, IL 60433

Athletics
Joliet Junior College is a member of both the National Junior College Athletic Association (NJCAA) and the North Central Community College Conference.

The school currently sponsors the following sports:
Men's: baseball, basketball, cheerleading, cross-country, and soccer
Women's: basketball, cheerleading, cross-country, soccer, softball, and volleyball.

The football program was eliminated in 2011 after 62 years of play due to budget cuts and to allow the school to be in compliance with Title IX.

National championships
 NJCAA National Football Championship, 2002
 NJCAA Men's Division III Basketball Championship, 2010, 1994
 NJCAA Division III Baseball National Championship, 2012, 2008, 1994

In 2017 JJC opened a new facility called the Event Center which is home to the athletic department and is used for special events and graduation ceremonies.

Notable alumni
Katherine Dunham, 1928 - American dancer, choreography, author, educator and social activist
Dr. John C. Houbolt, 1938 - NASA scientist
George Sangmeister, 1951 - former Illinois Congressman
Phyllis Reynolds Tedesco Naylor, 1953 -  author of children’s books, including Shiloh. 1992 Newbery Medal Winner
Harry Geris, 1969 - Canadian Olympic wrestler
Curtis J. Crawford, 1971 - CEO, Xceo Inc.
Arnette Hallman, 1978 - Professional basketball player
Kelvin Hayden, 2003 - Professional Football Player with the Chicago Bears
Rob Ninkovich, 2004 - American football defensive end for the New England Patriots
Jeris Pendleton, 2008- Professional Football Player with the Jacksonville Jaguars
Mary K. O'Brien - Illinois state legislator and judge

References

External links

 
1901 establishments in Illinois
Community colleges in Illinois
Education in Joliet, Illinois
Educational institutions established in 1901
Buildings and structures in Joliet, Illinois
NJCAA athletics